2008 Malta Open is a darts tournament, which took place in Malta in 2008.

Results

References

2008 in darts
2008 in Maltese sport
Darts in Malta